Park Nam-choon (born 2 July 1958) is a South Korean public servant and politician who served as the mayor of Incheon from 1 July 2018 to 30 June 2022.

References

External links
 Park Nam-choon's Blog

1958 births
Living people
Minjoo Party of Korea politicians
People from Incheon
Mayors of Incheon